Siegfried Schoenbohm (1938 – spring 2006) was an opera stage director, born in South Dakota, USA. He was assistant of Walter Felsenstein. 

He worked at: 
Komische Oper Berlin (1966ff),
Heidelberg Opera (1973–1978),
Freiburg Stadttheater (1981–1983),
and Kassel Opera (1983–1991).
He was guest director (premieres) at Staatsoper Hamburg, Essen, Bonn here staging Richard Wagner's Der Ring des Nibelungen, Die Walküre 1998, Siegfried 1999, Dortmund, Hanover, Frankfurt, Athens.
He also was the first stage-director of Tiriel.
He was the librettist of Argyrēs Kounadēs Die bakchen (Euripides (1996).

External links
Lady Macbeth of Mzensk

1938 births
2006 deaths
Schoenbohm, Siegfried